Dnyandeo Yashwantrao Patil (born 22 October 1935) was an Indian politician who was Governor of Bihar, state in eastern India from 29 May 2012 to 26 November 2014. He is an educator and was a leader of the Indian National Congress from Maharashtra state. He was appointed the Governor of West Bengal (additional charge). On 24 December 2018, he joined Nationalist Congress Party.

Early life 
He was born at Ambap village in the present-day Kolhapur district, Bombay state.

Educational institutions 
A number of educational institutions were founded by him, which include:
 Dr. D. Y. Patil Vidyapeeth, Pune
 Padmashree D. Y. Patil Vidyapeeth, Navi Mumbai
 Dr. D. Y. Patil Medical College Navi Mumbai
 D. Y. Patil Education Society, Kolhapur 
 Dr. D. Y. Patil Sports Academy
 Dr. D. Y. Patil Knowledge City in Pune
 Dr. D. Y Patil International School, Mumbai
 D. Y. Patil International School, Nagpur
 Dr DY Patil International School, Kangra (Himachal Pradesh)
 D. Y. Patil college of Engineering and Technology, Kolhapur
 D. Y. Patil Medical College, Kolhapur
 Dr. D.Y. Patil College of Engineering, Pune
 D Y Patil Hospital, Mumbai
 D. Y. Patil International School, Belgium
 Dr D.Y. Patil Junior College, Pune
 DYPDC Center for Automotive Research and Studies
 Dr DY Patil Pushpalata Patil International School, Patna
 Dr DY Patil B-school, Pune
 Dr. D. Y. Patil Biotechnology & Bioinformatics Institute, Pune
He received the Padma Shri award in 1991 for social work.

Political career 
Patil was elected to the Kolhapur Municipal Council as a Congress candidate in 1957 and remained in office until 1962. He was the member of the Maharashtra Vidhan Sabha from 1967-78. In both the 1967 and 1972 elections, he was elected from Panhala Vidhan Sabha constituency. He was appointed the Governor of Tripura state on 21 November 2009 and took the oath of office and secrecy on 27 November 2009. He was appointed the Governor of Bihar on 9 March 2012.

Notes

External links 
Official Website of Dr. D. Y. Patil Group

1935 births
Living people
Indian National Congress politicians from Maharashtra
Marathi people
People from Kolhapur
Governors of Tripura
Governors of West Bengal
Recipients of the Padma Shri in social work
Maharashtra MLAs 1967–1972
Maharashtra MLAs 1972–1978
Shivaji University alumni
Social workers
Social workers from Maharashtra
Nationalist Congress Party politicians